The 2007 LPGA Tour was a series of weekly golf tournaments for elite female golfers from around the world that took place from February through December 2007. The tournaments were sanctioned by the United States-based Ladies Professional Golf Association (LPGA). In 2007, prize money on the LPGA Tour was $54.285 million, the highest to date.

Lorena Ochoa topped the money list with a record $4,364,994, easily surpassing Annika Sörenstam's previous record of $2,863,904. Sörenstam was out most of the 2007 with neck and back injuries. Ochoa led the tour in victories in 2007 with eight wins; Suzann Pettersen of Norway had five.

The four major championships were won by: Morgan Pressel (Kraft Nabisco Championship), Suzann Pettersen (LPGA Championship), Cristie Kerr (U.S. Women's Open), and Lorena Ochoa (Women's British Open).  All four majors were won by first-time major winners. The British Open also marked a breakthrough for women's golf; for the first time the event took place at historic St Andrews in Scotland, the fabled "home of golf," that had previously been off-limits to women.

In a slight reversal of a trend from recent years,  Americans saw a relative resurgence in dominance in 2007, winning 12 events. For the first time since 2000, two Americans won majors. However, only one American, Paula Creamer, won more than one event, while Mexico's Lorena Ochoa won eight times and Norway's Suzann Pettersen five. Koreans won only four events, seven fewer than the 11 won in 2006.

For details of what happened in the main tournaments of the year see 2007 in golf.

Tournament schedule and results
ADT Playoff Categories:
 winner: Official LPGA Tour events with a purse of at least $2,000,000. Winners of these events automatically qualify for the ADT Championship.
 standard: Winners do not automatically qualify for the ADT Championship; the ADT points system is used.
 unofficial: These events are not official LPGA Tour events and participation is not part of the ADT Playoff system.

The number in parentheses after winners' names show the player's total number of official money, individual event wins on the LPGA Tour including that event.

Tournaments in bold are majors.
*The LPGA NW Arkansas Championship was not completed due to inclement weather. Only 18 holes were played so it was not an official tournament, nor did the money count as official money.
**The Wendy's 3-Tour Challenge was held on November 13. It was broadcast on television on December 22 and 23. The official LPGA Tour schedule listed the tournament dates based on the television broadcast.

Leaders
Money List leaders

Full 2007 Official Money List

Scoring Average leaders

Full 2007 Scoring Average List - navigate to "2007", then "Scoring Average"

Award winners
The three competitive awards given out by the LPGA each year are:
The Rolex Player of the Year is awarded based on a formula in which points are awarded for top-10 finishes and are doubled at the LPGA's four major championships and at the season-ending ADT Championship. The points system is: 30 points for first; 12 points for second; nine points for third; seven points for fourth; six points for fifth; five points for sixth; four points for seventh; three points for eighth; two points for ninth and one point for 10th.
2007 Winner: Lorena Ochoa. Runner-up: Suzann Pettersen
The Vare Trophy, named for Glenna Collett-Vare, is given to the player with the lowest scoring average for the season.
2007 Winner: Lorena Ochoa. Runner-up: Paula Creamer
The Louise Suggs Rolex Rookie of the Year Award is awarded to the first-year player on the LPGA Tour who scores the highest in a points competition in which points are awarded at all full-field domestic events and doubled at the LPGA's four major championships. The points system is: 150 points for first; 80 points for second; 75 points for third; 70 points for fourth; and 65 points for fifth. After fifth place, points are awarded in increments of three, beginning at sixth place with 62 points. Rookies who make the cut in an event and finish below 41st each receive five points.  The award is named after Louise Suggs, one of the founders of the LPGA.
2007 Winner: Angela Park. Runner-up: In-Kyung Kim

See also
2007 in golf
2007 Duramed Futures Tour
2007 Ladies European Tour

LPGA Tour seasons
LPGA Tour